Paul Annacone and Christo van Rensburg won in the final 7–5, 7–5, 6–4 in the final against Sherwood Stewart and Kim Warwick.

Seeds

Draw

Finals

Top half

Section 1

Section 2

Bottom half

Section 3

Section 4

External links
1985 Lipton International Players Championships Doubles Draw

Men's Doubles